Heiltsuk-Oowekyala is a Northern Wakashan (Kwakiutlan) language spoken in the Central Coast region of the Canadian province of British Columbia, spoken by the Wuikinuxv (Oweekeno) and Heiltsuk peoples. It has two dialects, Heiltsuk (Bella Bella) and Oowekyala (Wuikyala), which unlike other Wakashan languages are tonal. It has no traditional name, so the hyphenated construction Heiltsuk-Oowekyala is used by linguists. Ethnologue calls this language "Heiltsuk", with the Bella Bella dialect (Heiltsuk) labelled "Northern Heiltsuk" and the Oowekyala dialect labeled "Southern Heiltsuk".

Heiltsuk  is spoken by the Bella Bella  and Haihais  peoples; Oowekyala  by the Wuikinuxv .

Phonology

Heiltsuk-Oowekyala, like Nuxálk (Bella Coola), allows long sequences of obstruents, as in the following 7-obstruent word from the Oowekyala variety:

   'the invisible one here-with-me will be short'   (Howe 2000: 5)
 : kxlqsłcxʷ - you struck a match for me

Writing system
The spelling adopted by the Heiltsuk Education Cultural Center was designed by John C. Rath, linguistic consultant Heiltsuk Cultural Center in the 1970s and 1980s.

In Rath's spelling, the lambda letters λ, ƛ, ƛ̓ can be replaced by dh, th, t̓h if they are not accessible on the keyboard. The same is true of ɫ, which can be replaced by lh.

References

External links
 The Heiltsuk-Oweek'ala Language
 Bibliography of Materials on the Heiltsuk Language
 The Wakashan Languages
 map of Northwest Coast First Nations (including Oowekyala, described on the map as "Oowekeeno")

Bibliography
 Boas, Franz. (1928). Bella Bella texts. Columbia University contributions to anthropology (No. 5).
 Boas, Franz. (1932). Bella Bella tales. Memoirs of the American Folklore Society (No. 25).
 Hanuse, R., Sr.; Smith, H.; & Stevenson, D. (Eds.) (1983?). The Adjee and the Little Girl.  Rivers  Inlet, BC: Oowekyala Language Project.
 Hilton, Suzanne; & Rath, John C. (1982). Oowekeeno oral traditions. Ottawa: National Museums  of Canada.
 Howe, Darin. (1998). Aspects of Heiltsuk laryngeal phonology. Ms., University of British Columbia.
 
 Johnson, S.; Smith, H.; & Stevenson, D. (1983?). What time is it? Rivers Inlet, BC: Oowekyala  Language Project.
 Johnson, S.; Smith, H.; & Stevenson, D. (1983?). Fishing at Rivers Inlet. Rivers Inlet, BC: Oowekyala Language Project.
 Johnson, S.; Smith, H.; & Stevenson, D. (1983?). Qaquthanugva uikala. Rivers Inlet, BC: Oowekyala  Language Project.
 Johnson, S.; Smith, H.; & Stevenson, D. (1983?). Sisa'kvimas. Rivers Inlet, BC: Oowekyala Language Project.
 Johnson, S.; Smith, H.; & Stevenson, D. (1983?). ’Katemxvs ’Wuik’ala. Rivers Inlet, BC: Oowekyala  Language Project.
 Johnson, S.; Smith, H.; & Stevenson, D. (1984?). Oowekyala words. Rivers Inlet, BC: Oowekyala  Language Project.
 Lincoln, Neville J.; & Rath, John C. (1980). North Wakashan comparative root list. Ottawa: National Museums of Canada.
 Poser, William J. (2003). The status of documentation for British Columbia native languages. Yinka Dene Language Institute Technical Report (No. 2). Vanderhoof, British Columbia: Yinka Dene Language Institute.
 Rath, John C. (1981). A practical Heiltsuk–English dictionary. Canadian Ethnology Service, Mercury Series paper (No. 75). Ottawa: National Museum of Man (now Hull, Quebec: Museum of Civilization).
 
 Stevenson, David. (1980). The Oowekeeno people: A cultural history. Ottawa, Ontario: National Museum of Man (now Hull, Quebec: Museum of Civilization). (Unpublished).
 Stevenson, David. (1982). The ceremonial names of the Oowekeeno people of Rivers Inlet. Ottawa, Ontario: National Museum of Man (now Hull, Quebec: Museum of Civilization). (Unpublished).
 Storie, Susanne. (Ed.). (1973). Oweekano Stories. (Special Collections: E99). Victoria: British Columbia Indian Advisory Committee.
 Windsor, Evelyn W. (1982). Oowekeeno oral traditions as told by the late chief Simon Walkus, Sr. Hilton, S.; & Rath, J. C. (Eds.). Mercury series (No. 84). Ottawa: National Museum of Man (now Hull, Quebec: Museum of Civilization).

Wakashan languages
Indigenous languages of the Pacific Northwest Coast
First Nations languages in Canada
Endangered Wakashan languages